Shuaria is a genus of flowering plants belonging to the family Gesneriaceae.

Its native range is Ecuador.

Species
Species:
 Shuaria ecuadorica D.A.Neill & J.L.Clark

References

Gesnerioideae
Gesneriaceae genera